Clapton is an English surname. Notable people with the surname include:

Danny Clapton (1934–1986), English footballer
Eric Clapton (born 1945), English musician
Michele Clapton, British costume designer
Nathaniel L. Clapton (1903–1967), English schoolmaster
Nicholas Clapton (born 1955), English singer and writer
Richard Clapton (born 1951), Australian musician

Fictional characters
 Jamie Clapton, from the British soap opera Doctors

English-language surnames